Declan O'Dwyer may refer to:

 Declan O'Dwyer (hurler) (born 1987), inter-county hurling player for Dublin
 Declan O'Dwyer (director) (born 1968), writer, producer and film & television director